Joseph Manes Österreicher, Hungarian physician; born at Óbuda 1759; died at Vienna, December 14, 1831.

He studied medicine, but could not practise until after the promulgation of the edict of toleration by Emperor Joseph II in 1781. He received his medical diploma in 1782. He was thereupon appointed physician at the hospital in his native town, and subsequently head physician of the county of Zala. In 1785 he became physician at the health resort of Balatonfüred.

In 1802 Österreicher went to Vienna to practise. His investigations into the adulteration of food attracted the attention of Emperor Francis, who rewarded him with handsome gifts; and on his appointment as chief physician to the imperial household in 1818, he received the great gold medal of citizenship.

Österreicher's works include:
 Analysis Aquarum Budensium Item Aquæ Sarisapiensis et Acidulæ Fürediensis, Vienna, 1781
 Nachricht von den Bestandtheilen und Kräften des Füreder Sauerbrunnens, ib. 1792
 Sal Mirabilis Nativus Hungaricus, ib. 1801

References 
 

1756 births
1831 deaths
People from Óbuda
Hungarian Jews
18th-century Hungarian people
19th-century Hungarian physicians
Austro-Hungarian Jews